Shamim Ahmed is an Indian judge who is serving as Judge of Allahabad High Court. He formerly served as Additional Judge of the same court.

Personal life 
He was born in March 8, 1966. He graduated in law and arts from University of Allahabad.

References 

1966 births
Living people